Gilles Müller was the defending champion, but he did not participate this year.

Rajeev Ram won the title, defeating Jason Jung in the final, 6–1, 6–2.

Seeds

Draw

Finals

Top half

Bottom half

References
 Main Draw
 Qualifying Draw

Jalisco Open - Singles